Promised Land is the seventh album by Dar Williams  released September 9, 2008 on Razor & Tie, the label that has released almost all of her albums. It was her first studio album in three years.

Track listing
All songs are written by Dar Williams if not noted otherwise.
"It's Alright" – 3:27
"Book of Love" (Dar Williams, Lara Meyerratken) – 3:34
"The Easy Way" – 3:31
"The Tide Falls Away" (Dar Williams, Gary Louris) – 2:46
"Buzzer" – 2:57
"The Business of Things" – 2:31
"You Are Everyone" – 4:30
"Go to the Woods" – 2:54
"Holly Tree" – 4:13
"Troubled Times" (Adam Schlesinger, Chris Collingwood) – 3:34
"Midnight Radio" (Stephen Trask) – 4:27
"Summerday" (Dar Williams, Rob Hyman) – 3:22

The song "Buzzer" was inspired by the Milgram experiment; "Midnight Radio" is a cover of a song from Hedwig and the Angry Inch, written by a friend of hers from college.  "Troubled Times" is a cover of a Fountains of Wayne song from that band's 1999 album Utopia Parkway.

Reception

Slant Magazine called Promised Land "perhaps her strongest start-to-finish album since 1996's Mortal City.  A review from The Washington Post said the album "lacks any musical growth" though a "newcomer to her music might appreciate the tunes."

The album entered the Billboard 200 album chart at #95, making it the highest-charting album of her career.

References

2008 albums
Dar Williams albums
Razor & Tie albums
Albums produced by Brad Wood